The following is a list of the winners of the World Men's Curling Championship since the inception of the championships in 1959.

Medalists

All-time medal table
As of 2022 World Championships

Performance timeline

See also
List of World Women's Curling Champions
List of World Mixed Doubles Curling Champions
List of Olympic medalists in curling
List of Paralympic medalists in wheelchair curling

Notes
Bronze medals were only awarded from 1986. Table shows third-place finishers before then.
1989–1994: Two bronze medals were awarded.

References

World Curling Champions
Curling-related lists
Curling